Craigville Depot is a historic train station located in Jefferson Township, Allen County, Indiana, USA. It was built in 1879 and is a one-story, wood-frame building, measuring 16 feet wide, 32 feet long and 16 feet 6 inches high. The gable roof has a four-foot overhang and elaborate Stick Style / Eastlake movement ornamentation. The building was moved from its original location in 1950 and again in 1979. It was restored by Edward Byer who was the owner of the New Haven and Lake Erie Railroad.

It was added to the National Register of Historic Places in 1984, and was delisted in 2023.

References

Railway stations on the National Register of Historic Places in Indiana
Railway stations in the United States opened in 1879
Queen Anne architecture in Indiana
Transportation buildings and structures in Allen County, Indiana
Former National Register of Historic Places in Indiana